The 2022 European Aquatics Championships took place in Rome, Italy, from 11 to 21 August 2022. The event exactly coincided with, but was not officially part of, the 2022 European Championships. This diverged from the joined format of the 2018 edition, which was held as part of the inaugural 2018 European Championships.

Schedule 
A total of 75 medal events were held across 5 disciplines. Competition dates by discipline are:

 Swimming: 11–17 August
 Open water swimming: 20–21 August
 Artistic swimming: 11–15 August
 Diving: 15–21 August
 High diving: 18–20 August

Overall medal table
After all 75 events (2 cancelled).
‡ The events previously cancelled are restored and reassigned.

Team trophy
Results:

Swimming (50 m)

Open water swimming

Artistic swimming

Diving

High diving

Swimming

Medal table
After all 43 events.

Men

 Swimmers who participated in the heats only and received medals.

Women

 Swimmers who participated in the heats only and received medals.

Mixed events

 Swimmers who participated in the heats only and received medals.

Diving

Medal table
After all 13 events.

Men

Women

Mixed events

High diving

Medal table
After all 2 events.

Results

Open water swimming

Medal table
After all 5 events (2 cancelled).‡ The events previously cancelled are restored and reassigned.

Men

† Cancelled due to extreme weather‡ The race positions and medals have been restored and reassigned.

Women

† Cancelled due to extreme weather‡ The race positions and medals have been restored and reassigned.

Team

Artistic swimming

Medal table
After all 12 events.

Results

References

External links
Official web site
 Results
 Results book − Artistic swimming
 Results book − Diving
 Results book − High diving
 Results book − Open water swimming
 Results book − Swimming

 
2022
European Championships
2022 in Italian sport
Swimming competitions in Italy
International aquatics competitions hosted by Italy
August 2022 sports events in Italy
Sports competitions in Rome